Vincent Riendeau (born December 13, 1996) is a Canadian elite diver. He won a silver medal at the 2015 FINA World Championships in the 10 m mixed synchro event and a silver medal at the 2015 Pan American Games in the 10 m synchro event. He competed at several World Cups and Grand Prix events.

Career
He was selected as part of the Canadian Olympic team for the 2016 games in Rio and competed in the 10m platform alongside Maxim Bouchard.

At the 2019 edition of the event, along with his partner Nathan Zsombor-Murray finished in 11th place in the men's 10 m synchro event. Under a month later, the pair won silver in the same event at the 2019 Pan American Games in Lima, Peru.

At the 2021 FINA Diving World Cup, Riendeau and Zsombor-Murray won bronze in the 10 m synchro event, claiming Canada an Olympic berth. In June 2021, Riendeau was officially named to represent Canada at the 2020 Summer Olympics.

References

External links
Vincent Riendeau at Diving Plongeon Canada

1996 births
Canadian male divers
Living people
Commonwealth Games bronze medallists for Canada
Pan American Games bronze medalists for Canada
Divers from Montreal
Divers at the 2014 Commonwealth Games
Divers at the 2015 Pan American Games
Divers at the 2016 Summer Olympics
Divers at the 2018 Commonwealth Games
Olympic divers of Canada
Commonwealth Games medallists in diving
Pan American Games medalists in diving
Divers at the 2019 Pan American Games
Medalists at the 2015 Pan American Games
Medalists at the 2019 Pan American Games
Divers at the 2020 Summer Olympics
World Aquatics Championships medalists in diving
Medallists at the 2014 Commonwealth Games
Medallists at the 2018 Commonwealth Games